Richard "Richie" Gendall (born 25 September 1960, Wrexham) is a Welsh former professional footballer who played in the English Football League for Chester.

A Midfielder, Gendall was a contemporary of Ian Rush in the Chester youth squad in the late 1970s. Along with other homegrown youngsters such as Terry Cooke, Paul Needham and Peter Zelem, Gendall graduated to the first–team squad at Sealand Road in the early 1980s and was handed his professional debut as substitute for Cooke in a 0–0 draw against Burnley shortly before his 20th birthday on 25 September 1980.

He went on to start four league games during the season but did not feature again and moved on to non–league side Bangor City.

References

1960 births
Living people
Footballers from Wrexham
Welsh footballers
English Football League players
Association football midfielders
Chester City F.C. players
Bangor City F.C. players